Anel Rashkaj (born 19 August 1989) is a Kosovan professional footballer who plays as a midfielder for Swedish club Örgryte. A full international between 2014 and 2020, he won 14 caps for the Kosovo national team.

Club career

Halmstads BK

Rashkaj started to play football for KF Liria, in Prizren, SFR Yugoslavia. At the age of 14 he moved with his family to Halmstad in Sweden, where he continued his football career in IF Leikin, however only for a few months before leaving for local rivals Halmstads BK. Although he had not been selected as a trainee, a youth team player training with the senior squad, in 2007 he was put on the bench home against IFK Göteborg in Allsvenskan and in the following away game against Kalmar FF he made his debut, replacing Martin Fribrock, just days following his 18th birthday.

Prior to the 2008 season. He was raised from the youth team to become a full member of the senior squad, mainly being used as left winger. In 2009 Rashkaj and Michael Görlitz were the only players to have played in all league games of the season, 30 matches in total, he also represented the club in all the other 17 games of the year, two cup and 15 friendly matches, thus being the only player that had played in all the club's matches in that year. Anel Rashkaj scored his first league goal in 2009 against Kalmar FF.

The 2010 season saw Janne Andersson leave as Halmstads BK manager and being replaced by Lars Jacobsson, the former assistant manager. Lars continued with Janne's 4-5-1 system, Rashkaj played most of his matches on the right side of the midfield, few times being used as left winger, scoring his second goal early in the season in Halmstad's 4–0 win over Åtvidabergs FF. The 2011 season started as the one before, Lars Jacobsson left the club and be replaced by Spanish Josep Clotet Ruiz, along with the new manager came a number of Spanish midfielders, which saw Anel moved from the starting lineup to the bench in the beginning of the league season, against many people's expectations. In the mid of the 2011 season the Spanish players left as their loan ended with the club and Clotet Ruiz was sacked following a long serie of poor results, under new manager Jens Gustafsson Rashkaj returned to the starting lineup, he was however unable to help Halmstad from being relegated by the end of the season.

Following the end of the 2011 season, several Halmstad players decided to leave the club, Anel Rashkaj among them, as his contract with the club ended. Rumors placed him in both Örebro SK and Kalmar FF.

Sandnes Ulf
On 30 January 2012, newly promoted Norwegian club Sandnes Ulf, confirmed that they had signed Rashkaj on a one-year contract.

AFC Eskilstuna
On 27 December 2016, Rashkaj signed with the newly promoted team of Allsvenskan side AFC Eskilstuna. On 2 April 2017, he made his debut in a 3–1 away defeat against GIF Sundsvall after being named in the starting line-up.

Prishtina
On 11 August 2017, Rashkaj signed to Football Superleague of Kosovo side Prishtina, on a two-year contract. On 20 August 2017, he made his debut in a 0–1 home defeat against Drita after being named in the starting line-up. On 29 September 2017, Rashkaj disconnected the contract with Prishtina due to not adapting.

Return to AFC Eskilstuna
On 18 December 2017, Rashkaj returned to Superettan side AFC Eskilstuna. On 31 March 2018, he made his debut in a 0–0 home draw against IK Brage after being named in the starting line-up. On 21 November 2019, Rashkaj disconnected the contract with AFC Eskilstuna.

SJK
On 8 February 2020, Rashkaj joined Veikkausliiga side SJK. Six days later, he made his debut with SJK in the 2020 Finnish Cup group stage against KuPS after being named in the starting line-up. On 13 November, Rashkaj left the club.

Örgryte
On 21 January 2021, Rashkaj signed a two-year contract with Superettan club Örgryte.

International career

Early career 
On 27 March 2009, In an interview with the local newspaper Hallandsposten, Rashkaj stated that he had been in contact with Swedish U21 co-manager Jörgen Lennartsson, who had told him that he just had missed out on the 2009 UEFA European Under-21 Football Championship as he had not yet gained Swedish citizenship. He also stated in the interview that he would choose Sweden ahead of Kosovo, if he was considered good enough to get a position on the Swedish team. In another interview with Fotbolldirekt.se, he stated that Albania had already approached him and he had however turned them down.

Kosovo 
In 2009. Rashkaj was called up to the unofficial Kosovo national team, playing under the name Team Kosovo, to play in two matches against Swedish opposition, first against 2008 Swedish champions Kalmar FF. Rashkaj did not take part in the second match against Malmö FF.

On 17 February 2010, Rashkaj was again called up from Kosovo for a friendly match against Albania.

On 10 June 2010, Rashkaj participated as team captain when Kosovo played a friendly against his club Halmstads BK on Örjans Vall in Halmstad, the match ended 4–4 with another Halmstads BK and Kosovo national player Kujtim Bala, scoring a goal.

On 28 July 2010, Rashkaj announced that he had chosen to represent the Kosovo, stating that he wished to play national team football and that he believed he would have more chance of doing so with Kosovo rather than Sweden. He also stated that he had not yet fully closed the door regarding Sweden as U21 coach Jörgen Lennartsson had stated he wished to see Rashkaj in the U21 team and the 2011 U21 European Championship in Denmark. However, he has yet to obtain Swedish citizenship and Kosovo has yet to be approved by FIFA.

He announced his retirement from the Kosovo national team on 4 June 2021, having won 14 caps for the nation between 2014 and 2020.

Career statistics

Club

International

References

External links

 

1989 births
Living people
Sportspeople from Prizren
Kosovan emigrants to Sweden
Association football midfielders
Kosovan men's footballers
Kosovo international footballers
Swedish men's footballers
Halmstads BK players
Sandnes Ulf players
AFC Eskilstuna players
FC Prishtina players
Seinäjoen Jalkapallokerho players
Allsvenskan players
Norwegian First Division players
Eliteserien players
Football Superleague of Kosovo players
Veikkausliiga players
Swedish expatriate footballers
Kosovan expatriate footballers
Expatriate footballers in Norway
Expatriate footballers in Finland
Swedish expatriate sportspeople in Norway
Kosovan expatriate sportspeople in Norway
Kosovo pre-2014 international footballers